Illinois's 7th House of Representatives district is a Representative district within the Illinois House of Representatives located in Cook County, Illinois and DuPage County, Illinois. It has been represented by Democratic Illinois House Speaker Chris Welch since January 9, 2013. Democrat Cory Foster was the previous incumbent for a couple of months.

Located in the Chicago metropolitan area, the district covers all or parts of Bellwood, Berkeley, Broadview, Elmhurst, Forest Park, Hillside, Hinsdale, La Grange Park, Maywood, Melrose Park, Northlake, Oak Brook, River Forest, Westchester, and Western Springs.

Representative district history

Prominent representatives

List of representatives

1849 – 1873

1957 – 1973

1983 – Present

Historic District Boundaries

Electoral history

2030 – 2022

2020 – 2012

2010 – 2002

2000 – 1992

1990 – 1982

1970 – 1962

1960 – 1956

Notes

References

Illinois House of Representatives districts
Government of Chicago